Carol Ann Heyer (born February 2, 1950) is an American illustrator and children's writer. Her three works most widely held in WorldCat libraries are picture books written by Henry Winkler.

Early life and education
Heyer's parents are William J. and Merlyn M. Heyer. She attended Moorpark College, and then California Lutheran University.

Career
Heyer has contributed many illustrations to speculative fiction magazines and anthologies, primarily during the 1990s. She has illustrated role-playing game materials for Dungeons & Dragons, including the AD&D second edition Tome of Magic and Legends & Lore.

She is known for her work on the collectible card game Magic: The Gathering.

She co-wrote the screenplay for the 1986 action film Thunder Run.

She also creates children's picture books. Once Upon a Cool Motorcycle Dude, published by Walker Books in 2005, won the annual Monarch Award in 2009 by vote of Illinois schoolchildren in grades K–3. The story by Kevin O'Malley features a "folktale" by two children, created in the schoolroom as they tell it alternately and uncooperatively. O'Malley illustrated the frame story while Heyer and Scott Goto portrayed the segments created by the schoolgirl (Heyer, "Princess Tenderheart ... in flowing silk gowns and blonde tresses") and schoolboy (Goto, the Dude and a giant introduced in "testosterone-soaked oils"). "The unusual collaboration among illustrators works seamlessly", according to Kirkus. The same authors created a sequel, Once Upon a Royal Superbaby (Walker, 2010), featuring the son of now-Queen Tenderheart and the Motorcycle Dude. 

The picture books both written and illustrated by Heyer are Christmas and Easter stories, primarily, and re-tellings of fairy tales and legends.

References

External links
 

 
 

1950 births
American children's book illustrators
American speculative fiction artists
California Lutheran University alumni
Living people
Moorpark College alumni
Role-playing game artists
Science fiction artists